Maracayia chlorisalis is a moth of the family Crambidae described by Francis Walker in 1859. It is found from North America through Costa Rica south at least to Brazil.

External links
 - with a photo

Moths described in 1859
Spilomelinae

vi:Maracayia